Coronado 9 is an American crime drama series starring Rod Cameron that aired in syndication in 1960.

Synopsis
Set in San Diego, California, the series follows Dan Adams (Cameron), a former United States Navy intelligence officer turned private detective. The show's title was taken from the telephone exchange of Adams's office.

The Revue Productions series had 39 episodes that aired from September 6, 1960, and May 31, 1961.

Coronado 9 was produced by Richard Irving. Lawrence Kimble wrote scripts for it. It was sponsored in at least 70 markets by the Falstaff Brewing Company.

Guest stars
 Rayford Barnes
 Kathie Browne
 King Calder
 Anthony Caruso
 Virginia Christine
 Steve Darrell
 Don Devlin
 Roy Engel
 Bill Erwin
 Beverly Garland
 Clark Howat
 Ted Jordan
 DeForest Kelley 
 Robert Knapp
 Sue Ane Langdon
 Nan Leslie
 Ann McCrea
 Doug McClure 
 Eve Miller
 Read Morgan
 Ed Nelson
 Jay Novello
 J. Pat O'Malley 
 William Schallert
 David White

Production notes
The series was produced by Revue Studios, and  filmed in San Diego except for two episodes made in Honolulu and New Orleans.

Home media
On December 14, 2010, Timeless Media Group released Coronado 9 - The Complete Series on DVD in Region 1.

References

External links 
 

1960 American television series debuts
1961 American television series endings
1960s American crime drama television series
Black-and-white American television shows
English-language television shows
First-run syndicated television programs in the United States
Television series by Universal Television
Television shows set in San Diego
Coronado, California